The Gemini PDA is a personal digital assistant designed by Planet Computers in association with Martin Riddiford, who formerly worked on the Psion Series 5 in the 1990s, and crowdfunded via Indiegogo in 2017. The Gemini bucks the trend of modern smartphones in its screen being primarily used in landscape aspect, and having a keyboard, i.e. taking on the form of a subnotebook.

Planet supports running two operating systems on the device, and it dual-boots between Android and Linux. Other possibilities include Sailfish OS.

Before January 2018, preproduction devices were made available to reviewers, and mass production was in full swing in December 2017 with devices starting to ship in late January 2018 to Indiegogo backers.

Hardware 
 CPU/GPU system on a chip is a MediaTek Deca Core Helio, either the X25 or X27 chipset.
 2x Cortex A72 @ 2.6 GHz
 4x Cortex A53 @ 2.0 GHz
 4x Cortex A53 @ 1.6 GHz
 ARM Mali T880 MP4 @ 875 MHz
 RAM: 4 GB
 Flash: 64 GB
 microSDHC card slot
 Two USB-C connectors, only one of which can be used to charge it. Video out is possible with a proprietary HDMI adaptor, and not the standardised USB-C alternate mode.
 Display: 5.99" LCD, 2160×1080 (403 ppi, 2:1 aspect ratio)
 Mass: 320g
 Dimensions (mm): 171.4(W) × 79.3(D) × 15.1(H)
 Bluetooth: 4.1
 Wi-Fi: 802.11a/b/g/n/ac
 Radio bands (4G variant):
 GSM 850/900/1800/1900 MHz
 CDMA 850/1900 MHz BC0 BC1+ EVDO
 UMTS 900/2100 MHz
 LTE 1/2/3/4/5/7/12/17/20/41 (with VoLTE)
 MicroSIM slot and eSIM (4G variant)
 Battery: 4220 mAh
 Front camera 5 Mp
 GPS: with AGPS
 Sensors: Accelerometer, light sensor, gyro, magnetic sensor
 Audio:
 stereo speakers
 3.5mm headphone jack
 dual microphones

Some early devices were made with the X25 SoC as specified in the Indiegogo campaign, with the factory switching to X27 as stocks of the older X25 were depleted. They also have the eSIM feature disabled.

Two variants are sold, one with Wi-Fi only, one with Wi-Fi and mobile phone radios.

Optional accessories

The original Indiegogo campaign allowed backers to pay extra for various accessories and features:
 Leather pouch
 HDMI adaptor
 Rear camera 5Mp
 USB-C hub

References

External links
 
 

Personal digital assistants
Mobile phones with an integrated hardware keyboard
Computer-related introductions in 2018